We Sing Robbie Williams is the third game in the We Sing series for the Wii, following on from We Sing Encore. Developed by French studio Le Cortex, produced by Wired Productions, and published by Nordic Games Publishing. The singing game supports up to 4 players simultaneously, where each can use their own microphone. It is also the first edition in this series to feature an artist, which for this edition is Robbie Williams.

We Sing Robbie Williams was announced on 22 July 2010 and was released on 12 November 2010 in conjunction with Robbie Williams' new album In and Out of Consciousness: The Greatest Hits 1990–2010, which was released in October 2010.

Gameplay

The game's core features include singing lessons, solo, party and, Karaoke modes. The gameplay is similar to the SingStar set of video games, as players are required to sing along with music to score points, matching pitch and rhythm. The players can choose to play at an easy, medium or hard difficulty, with both short or full-length song options.

The game has anti-cheat technology whereby tapping or humming will register on the screen, but no points will be awarded. We Sing Encore also contains the addition of 'Star Notes' that allow the player to score even more points by matching the pitch and rhythm of certain hard-to-score parts of songs. After the player finishes singing, they can replay their performance; and get statistics about their performance. 

Due to hardware limitations, with the Wii only having two USB ports, a USB hub is required to add more USB ports. The game uses the standard Logitech USB microphone for the Wii.

Tracks
We Sing Robbie Williams features 25 songs spanning across seven albums from 1997 to 2010.

 Old Before I Die 1997
 Angels 1997
 Let Me Entertain You 1998
 No Regrets 1998
 Strong 1999
 She's the One 1999
 Rock DJ 2000
 Kids 2000
 Supreme 2000
 Let Love Be Your Energy 2001
 The Road to Mandalay 2001
 Eternity 2001
 Somethin' Stupid 2001
 Beyond the Sea 2001
 Mr. Bojangles 2002
 Feel 2002
 Come Undone 2003
 Something Beautiful 2003
 Sexed Up 2003
 Radio 2004
 Tripping 2005
 Advertising Space 2005
 Sin Sin Sin 2006
 Bodies 2009
 You Know Me 2009
 Shame (featuring Gary Barlow) 2010

It was announced on 11 October 2010 that the single Shame, featuring both Robbie Williams and Gary Barlow would be included as an extra 26th track.

See also
We Sing
We Sing Encore
SingStar
Karaoke Revolution
Lips

References

External links 
We Sing Website

2010 video games
Karaoke video games
Multiplayer and single-player video games
Music video games
Robbie Williams
THQ Nordic games
Video games developed in France
We Sing
Wii games
Wii-only games
Wired Productions games